This page is a list of the experimental television stations before 1946. After 1945 (in the United States) the television frequencies were opened up to commercialization and regular broadcasts began. Regular broadcast television start dates vary widely by country; in many regions, initial broadcast video deployment was delayed due to mobilisation for World War II.

(Note: The listing of current broadcast channels for these stations is not up-to-date as many low-VHF stations have moved to UHF frequencies as a result of digital television transition. This is less of an issue in the United Kingdom because of its all-UHF system, but most early US broadcasters were on affected channels before analogue shutdown. Very few full-service North American broadcasters remain on physical channels VHF 2-6 digitally due to impulse noise problems and strict limits on maximum transmitted power at these frequencies.)

Television stations, as of 1928

Television stations, from 1928 to 1939

Television stations, as of 1941

Television stations, from Jan. 3, 1945 to 1955

See also
 Timeline of the BBC
 History of television
 Timeline of the introduction of television in countries
 Timeline of the introduction of color television in countries
 Geographical usage of television
 Moving image formats
 Oldest radio station
 Narrow-bandwidth television
 Prewar television stations
 Television systems before 1940

Individual television stations
 WRGB
 WNBC-TV
 WCBS-TV
 KCBS-TV
 BBC / BBC Television

Broadcast television systems
 Television systems before 1940
 NTSC
 PAL
 SECAM
 ATSC and DVB-T

References

External links
 1936 German Olympics
 W1XAY at TVHistory.tv
 European Television Stations in 1932
 Post-war Stations
 W2XJT at EarlyTelevision.org
 Chicago TV
 www.terramedia.co.uk
 www.broadcastpioneers.com
 www.broadcastpioneers.com
 www.chicagotelevision.com
 Milwaukee TV Horror Hosts
 KC2XAK on gginfo.com
 Charles Francis Jenkins at TVHistory.tv
 W3XK in Columbus, OH
 W3XK
 W9XK Experimental Television at the University of Iowa
 List of Mechanical Television Stations at EarlyTelevision.org

History of television
Television by year